Caroline Garcia was the defending champion, but lost in the semifinals to Anastasija Sevastova in a rematch of the previous year's final. 

Sevastova went on to win the title, defeating Julia Görges in the final, 6–4, 3–6, 6–3.

The tournament marked the return of Victoria Azarenka from maternity leave. She lost in the second round to Ana Konjuh.

Seeds

Draw

Finals

Top half

Bottom half

Qualifying

Seeds

Qualifiers

Lucky loser
  Sara Errani

Draw

First qualifier

Second qualifier

Third qualifier

Fourth qualifier

Fifth qualifier

Sixth qualifier

External links
 Main draw
 Qualifying draw

Mallorca Open - Singles
Singles